Harry Charles John Lewis (born 20 December 1997) is an English professional footballer who plays as a goalkeeper for League Two side Bradford City.

Club career
Lewis joined Southampton's academy from Shrewsbury Town in 2015. After impressing with the under-23 side, Lewis made his professional debut for Southampton on 7 January 2017 against Norwich City in an FA Cup match. He conceded a penalty in the match as Southampton drew 2–2 at Carrow Road.

On 14 July 2017, he joined Scottish Championship club Dundee United on a one-year loan, having also signed a new three-year contract with Southampton. Five days later, he made his debut in a 3–0 win at Highland Football League club Buckie Thistle in the Scottish League Cup. He made 39 appearances in all competitions as Dundee United came third in the league and were eliminated 4–3 on aggregate by Livingston in the play-off semi-finals.

On 16 May 2022, it was confirmed that Lewis would join Bradford City on 1 July 2022 once his contract expires. In March 2023 Lewis handles the ball outside of the area after confusing the rugby markings on the pitch.

International career
Lewis has represented England at under-18 level. On 24 September 2014, he came on to the field to make his England U18s debut, replacing goalkeeper and captain Freddie Woodman in a 2–0 friendly defeat away to Italy at the Stadio Giovanni Chiggiato.

Personal life
Lewis is the grandson of former Shrewsbury Town and Stockport County goalkeeper Ken Mulhearn.

Career statistics

References

External links
 
 Sky Sports Profile
 Southampton FC profile

1997 births
Living people
Sportspeople from Shrewsbury
English footballers
England youth international footballers
Association football goalkeepers
Shrewsbury Town F.C. players
Southampton F.C. players
Dundee United F.C. players
Bradford City A.F.C. players
Scottish Professional Football League players